Nycteus is a genus of plate-thigh beetles in the family Eucinetidae. There are about 11 described species in Nycteus.

Species
These 11 species belong to the genus Nycteus:
 Nycteus bicolor (Reitter, 1887) g
 Nycteus falsus Vit, 1999 i c g b
 Nycteus hopffgarteni (Reitter, 1885) g
 Nycteus infumatus (LeConte, 1853) i c g b
 Nycteus meridionalis Laporte, 1836 g
 Nycteus oertzeni (Reitter, 1887) g
 Nycteus oviformis (LeConte, 1866) i c g b
 Nycteus prospector (Vit, 1985) g
 Nycteus punctulatus (LeConte, 1875) i c g b
 Nycteus testaceus (LeConte, 1866) i c g b
 Nycteus wollastoni Vit, 1999 i c g
Data sources: i = ITIS, c = Catalogue of Life, g = GBIF, b = Bugguide.net

References

Further reading

 
 

Scirtoidea
Articles created by Qbugbot